Bajgiran District (Persian for "toll station") is a district (bakhsh) in Quchan County, Razavi Khorasan province, Iran. At the 2006 census, its population was 10,038, in 2,658 families.  The district has one city: Bajgiran.  The district has one rural district (dehestan): Dowlatkhaneh Rural District.

References 

Districts of Razavi Khorasan Province
Quchan County